Chang Wu-yeh (born 19 December 1978 in Taichung County (now part of Taichung City)) is a Taiwanese football manager and former player. He currently manages Taipei Physical Education College's football team.

Player career
Chang, unlike many of his teammates who have played football since young ages, started his football career at the age of 14. After graduating from junior high school, he was enrolled into National Dajia Industrial Senior High School. He performed well in domestic youth competitions. He also played for the Taipei City Bank F.C. in the Chinese Taipei National Football League when he was 18.

However, he did not pass the entrance examination of Taipei Physical Education College. He chose to serve military service and was able to play for military-organized Flying Camel and National Sports Training Center football team due to his experience in Taipei City Bank F.C.

After completing the military service, Chang entered Taipei Physical Education College in 1998.

In 2001, he was called up to represent the Chinese Taipei national football team in the 2002 FIFA World Cup qualification rounds.

Managerial career
Since December 2005, he has been appointed assistant coach to Chinese Taipei national football team under then head coach Toshiaki Imai. He became Taipei Physical Education College football team's head coach in 2009.

Honours 
 Chinese Taipei National Football League Golden Shoe: 2004

References

External links

1978 births
Living people
Taiwanese footballers
Taiwanese football managers
Chinese Taipei international footballers
Tatung F.C. players
Footballers from Taichung
Association football defenders
Association football midfielders